Kayne Hammington (born 24 September 1990) is a New Zealand rugby union player who currently plays as a halfback for  in New Zealand's domestic Mitre 10 Cup and the  in the international Super Rugby competition.

Early career

Hammington was born in the town of Upper Hutt, which lies to the north-east of Wellington, New Zealand's capital city.   He was educated at St. Patrick's College, Silverstream in his hometown.

Senior career

He started out in provincial rugby with his local side, the Wellington Lions and made 9 appearances across the 2012 and 2013 ITM Cup seasons. However, due to strong competition among the Lions halfbacks, he opted to head north for 2014 and join .

Manawatu's stay in the Premiership would only last for 1 year, as a record of 3 wins from 10 games saw them relegated back down to the Championship for 2016.   Hammington also found the going tougher in his second year in Palmerston North, starting just 3 times and generally playing back up to Jamie Booth throughout the year.   2016 didn't get much better, with the Turbos, now a championship side once more, finishing in 5th place on the log to miss out on the promotion playoffs altogether while Hammington had to make do with being part of a halfback rotation system along with Booth and the experienced Toby Morland, he played 6 times throughout the season, including 3 starts.

Super Rugby

During the 2015 Super Rugby season, Hammington was called into the  squad as an injury replacement due to the absence of Tawera Kerr-Barlow, Augustine Pulu and Leon Fukofuka. It was a case of déjà vu in 2016 as another halfback injury crisis at the Chiefs saw Hammington once more brought in as injury cover.

He would join fellow Manawatu Turbo Aaron Smith and young  halfback Josh Renton in competition for the number 9 jersey in Tony Brown's side.

International

Hammington was a member of the New Zealand Under-20 side which won the 2010 IRB Junior World Championship in Argentina, playing 5 times.

Career Honours

New Zealand Under-20

IRB Junior World Championship - 2010 IRB Junior World Championship

North Harbour

ITM Cup Championship - 2014

Super Rugby Statistics

References

1990 births
Living people
New Zealand rugby union players
Rugby union scrum-halves
Wellington rugby union players
Manawatu rugby union players
Chiefs (rugby union) players
Sportspeople from Upper Hutt
People educated at St. Patrick's College, Silverstream
Highlanders (rugby union) players
Otago rugby union players
Rugby union players from the Wellington Region
Shimizu Koto Blue Sharks players